Lord Tracy is an American hard rock band formed in 1985.

History 
Lord Tracy originally consisted of former Black Oak Arkansas bassist Kinley "Barney" Wolfe, drummer Chris Craig and guitarist Jimmy Rusidoff. Terry Glaze, formerly of Pantera, joined in 1986 as lead vocalist. Their first album, Deaf Godz of Babylon, was released in the fall of 1989 on UNI Records / MCA. The album's lead single, "Out with the Boys", reached No. 40 on the Billboard Mainstream Rock Chart. A ballad, "Foolish Love", was the album's follow-up single. Although the Deaf Godz of Babylon album failed to sell many copies, it remains a notable release for its use of humor and its diverse influences, ranging from Beastie Boys to Motörhead. Following the release of Deaf Godz, the band toured extensively from 1989–1991 and broke apart while on the road in the summer of 1991.

Bassist Kinley Wolfe would go on to join The Cult as a touring member from 1991 to 1994 and then teamed up with guitarist Mark Christian from The Big F in the band Milk The Cow whose eponymous debut was issued in 1996. After moving back to Texas, he formed Dallas trio The American Fuse, releasing One Fell Swoop in 1997. More recently Wolfe has been playing with The Javelinas.

In 2004, Lord Tracy reunited and has since played a limited number of shows per year in Texas, Arizona, Mexico, Brazil and Spain. Guitar player Brian Harris replaced Jimmy Rusidoff in 2006. Lord Tracy continues to be creatively active and released the album Porn Again in 2008.

Between 2008 and 2010, Lord Tracy would play off and on throughout the south and mid west. In 2010, Patrick "Taz" Bentley, a founding member of Burden Bros., filled in for drummer Chris Craig for a hometown show at the House of Blues in Dallas. Craig was unable to play the show because of prior commitments. Instead of replacing Craig with Taz, the other members decided to form a new band with Taz playing drums. This band would initially be named Pinches Bolillos, but the name was changed to 76 early on. 76 does not play any Lord Tracy songs, writing and playing original songs instead.

On Saturday, April 6, 2013, the original lineup of Lord Tracy reunited to perform as the headline act at the Basement Reunion #5 at Trees in Dallas, Texas. On April 13, 2013, the band played a show at The Stage Stop in Memphis, Tennessee. Lord Tracy returned to The Stage Stop to play consecutive nights on February 2 and 3, 2018. The owner of The Stage Stop, Nita Makris, supported the band from their early days onwards, and requested they play two of the final shows at the venue before it closed. The final show was reserved for Seeing Red.

Members 
Current
Terry Glaze – lead vocals, rhythm guitar, piano (1986–1991, 2004–present)
Jimmy Rusidoff – lead guitar, backing vocals (1985–1991, 2004–2006, 2013-present)
Kinley "Barney" Wolfe – bass guitar, backing vocals (1985–1991, 2004–present)
Chris Craig – drums, percussion (1985–1991, 2004–present)

Former
Brian Harris – rhythm and lead guitar, backing vocals (2006–2013)

Discography 
DEAF GODS OF BABYLON (1989 © UNI Records, Inc.)
1 – Out With The Boys (3:53)
2 – East Coast Rose (5:50)
3 – She's A Bitch (4:33)
4 – Barney's Wank (0:36)
5 – Whatchadoin' (4:14)
6 – Chosen Ones (5:49)
7 – In Your Eyes (4:11)
8 – Rats Motel (3:39)
9 – Foolish Love (3:54)
10 – She Man Blues (0:21)
11 – King Of The Nighttime Cowboys (3:12)
12 – 3 H. C. (1:25)
13 – Submission (2:35)
14 – Pirahna (2:09)
15 – Ivory Lover (0:24)
All track names and times taken from CD label* UNID-606
Produced by: Mark Dodson

LIVE (Recorded at The Basement in Dallas, TX, in 1989 and released in 2004)
Transsexual
Rats Motel
Deserai
Me and The King
King of the Nighttime Cowboys
She's A Bitch
In Your Eyes
Whatchadoin'
Foolish Love
Barney's Bass Solo
East Coast Rose
Pirahna
3HC
I Want You
(Let's Go) Rodeo
Out With The Boys
Don't Give Up On Love

This is a live mix for the ZRock Concert series mixed by Danny Brown.

CULL NONE (2004)
Intro
Devil Song
Don't Give Up On Love
Fella Sho' Dance
Big Surprise
17 Year
Come Back To Me
Heart In Your Hands
Jes Like You
Drum Thang
Woman Is Wood
Beverly Hills
Yo Love
Big Black Cadillac
Can't Be Serious
Eat Them
Moby Dixie Head
Burning Love
Fleetwood Mac
Choo Choo

LORD TRACY #4 (2005)
Rip It Up (Paper Love)
Kick It Out
Saxophone
Wrong All The Right Outta Me
Drive All Night
Transsexual
Wind Me Up
Let's Go Rodeo
Debbie's Got A Chainsaw
Party At The Motel
Barney's Chained Melody
No More Tears
Back Again
Nobody's Business
Everything Sounds Allright
Paula's
Morning Light
If You Break My Heart (I'll Break Your Neck)

Un-release demo and live recordings recorded and mixed by Danny Brown

Porn Again (2008)
I Should've Known
Jinx
Too Much
Know Me
Everything
Friends
Long Way To Go
Wondermilk
Man In Japan
Number One Fan
Can't Be Wrong
Outasite
Wank 2000
Messin' Around

References

External links 
Official website
JC's Lord Tracy site
Xtreme South Entertainment
76 official website

1985 establishments in Tennessee
1991 disestablishments in Tennessee
Glam metal musical groups from Tennessee
Hard rock musical groups from Tennessee
Heavy metal musical groups from Tennessee
Musical groups established in 1985
Musical groups disestablished in 1991
Uni Records artists